Calycobathra acarpa is a moth in the family Cosmopterigidae. It is found in North Africa (Algeria) and the Near East (Israel).

The wingspan is 11–12 mm. Adults are on wing from April to June and from September to October. There are probably two generations per year.

References

Moths described in 1891
Chrysopeleiinae